2-Ethylphenol is an organic compound with the formula C2H5C6H4OH.  It is one of three isomeric ethylphenols. A colorless liquid, it occurs as an impurity in xylenols and as such is used in the production of commercial phenolic resins.  It is produced by ethylation of phenol using ethylene or ethanol in the presence of aluminium phenolate.

References 

Alkylphenols